Hotel Transylvania 3: Summer Vacation (released internationally as Hotel Transylvania 3: A Monster Vacation or simply Hotel Transylvania 3 as marketed on home release) is a 2018 American computer-animated monster comedy film produced by Sony Pictures Animation and distributed by Sony Pictures Releasing. The third installment in the Hotel Transylvania franchise and the sequel to Hotel Transylvania 2 (2015), it was directed by Genndy Tartakovsky, written by Tartakovsky and Michael McCullers, and features Adam Sandler, Andy Samberg, Selena Gomez, Kevin James, Fran Drescher, Steve Buscemi, Molly Shannon, Sadie Sandler, David Spade, Keegan-Michael Key, Asher Blinkoff, Chris Parnell and Mel Brooks reprising their roles, as well as new additions to the cast including Jim Gaffigan, Kathryn Hahn, Joe Jonas, Chrissy Teigen, Joe Whyte, Tara Strong and Tartakovsky. In the film, Dracula finds love with a ship captain named Ericka while on a vacation on a cruise liner with his family and friends, but Mavis later discovers that Ericka is actually the great-granddaughter of Abraham Van Helsing, Drac's arch-nemesis.

Hotel Transylvania 3: Summer Vacation premiered at the Annecy International Animated Film Festival on June 13, 2018, and was theatrically released in the United States on July 13. The film received mixed reviews from critics and grossed $528 million worldwide against a budget of $65–80 million. It was the highest-grossing film in the Hotel Transylvania series, Sony Pictures Animation's highest-grossing fully animated film. It was also the final film in the franchise to feature Adam Sandler and Kevin James as Dracula and Frankenstein, respectively, as Brian Hull and Brad Abrell both replaced them for the next and final installment Hotel Transylvania: Transformania, which was released on January 14, 2022.

Plot

Back in 1897, Dracula and his friends travel in disguise on a train to Budapest. However, Dracula's arch-nemesis Professor Abraham Van Helsing boards the train and unveils the monsters; the monsters escape by climbing through the roof, and Dracula pushes his friends off the train for their safety. Van Helsing becomes obsessed with destroying Dracula, but is constantly outsmarted by him.

In the present-day, a few weeks after the second film, Dracula is running his hotel business smoothly with Mavis and Johnny. Drac is depressed that he has remained single since his wife Martha's death despite his attempts to meet someone. Misinterpreting this as stress from overwork, Mavis books a cruise so they can all take a break and spend more time together as a family. Dracula, Johnny, Mavis, Dennis, Vlad, and the hotel guests board a cruise ship called Legacy. Dracula sees the ship's human captain, Ericka, and falls in love with her at first sight, something that he thought was impossible as he had already "zinged" before.

Ericka afterwards goes to a private and secret room on the lower decks where she meets up with Abraham Van Helsing, secretly her great-grandfather. Van Helsing has almost entirely mechanized his body to avoid death, and has a plan to eliminate all the monsters: on the cruise's arrival at the lost city of Atlantis, he will use an Instrument of Destruction in Atlantis' ruins. Van Helsing makes Ericka promise to not assassinate Dracula beforehand, but she makes repeated unsuccessful attempts to do so anyway. Dracula's friends hear Ericka complain about her inability to get him and misinterpret this as a sign of affection. Dracula nervously asks Ericka out on a date, and she accepts since she sees this as another opportunity to kill him. As they dine on a deserted island, Ericka unexpectedly begins to fall in love with Drac, after they learn about each other's pasts where they lost their loved ones - for Dracula, it was his beloved wife Martha and for Ericka, it was her parents.

Mavis discovers Dracula is interested in Ericka and becomes suspicious of Ericka's motives. The cruise ship reaches Atlantis, which has been converted into a casino; Dracula decides to tell Mavis the truth about Ericka but gets distracted seeing Ericka enter an underground crypt. Drac follows her, with Mavis not far behind, and learns that Ericka is after a "family heirloom". With Dracula's help, she evades the booby traps around the object and escapes. Mavis arrives and confronts them, and Dracula confesses that he "zinged" with Ericka, to Mavis' surprise and confusion. After Ericka is told what a "zing" is, her inner guilt about lying to Dracula forces her to reject Dracula's feelings for her, leaving Dracula heartbroken and Mavis feeling guilty.

A regretful Ericka gives Van Helsing the object—the Instrument of Destruction—and he sets a trap for the monsters at a dance party. Noticing that Dracula is still depressed about Ericka, Mavis takes advice from Johnny and tells her father to talk to Ericka, admitting that she was afraid of him leaving her, which allays Drac's fears. Van Helsing shows up and pushes away the DJ. Everyone runs away in fear. A horrified Murray pulls Griffin away. Dennis and Winnie run away in terror screaming, then a tentacle grabs them, and then Bob, still in disguise, comes and bites the tentacle and sets them free. Dracula tries to stop it, but the Kraken grabs Dracula and he tries to escape a few times. The Kraken grabs Dracula with the same tentacle which suffocates him, and Dracula. Kraken does the same with Mavis. When Ericka saves him, Dracula is knocked out. and a saddened Ericka is forced to reveal that she is his great-granddaughter. Van Helsing unveils the Instrument of Destruction—a case for a music note sheet—and plays a song that drives a friendly Kraken living near the island to attack the monsters. Dracula tries to stop the evil Kraken, but gets injured. Ericka saves Dracula from the evil Kraken and pleads with her great-grandfather to stop the destruction, confessing her love for Drac. This infuriates Van Helsing, and he attacks them both.

To pacify the Kraken, Johnny opens up a portable DJ kit and plays positive songs ("Good Vibrations" and "Don't Worry, Be Happy") to beat Van Helsing's song. Upon playing the "Macarena", the Kraken is relaxed and happy for good; Van Helsing is unable to counter the song as the humans and monsters begins to dance, including the music sheet, which rips itself to pieces during the process. When Van Helsing also dances, he accidentally slips and falls, but Dracula saves him. Touched by the act of kindness, Van Helsing apologizes to the monsters and gives everybody a full refund for the cruise, before sending them back.

Back at Hotel Transylvania, Dracula proposes to Ericka, who gets tongue-tied at the question before accepting.

Voice cast

Additionally, Tartakovsky, Whyte, Strong, and Teigen also reprised their roles in the French, German, Spanish, Italian, Russian, Polish, and Romanian language dubs of the movie.

Production

Development
In September 2015, Michelle Murdocca, the film's producer, said before the second film's release that the studio was "talking about number 3 and moving forward and taking the franchise to the next level," but thought that she and director Genndy Tartakovsky would not return, since they were working on Tartakovsky's Can You Imagine? before that project was later shelved. That same month, Tartakovsky stated that he will not return for the sequel, specifying to TheWrap that "two is enough. I have a lot of other ideas, and I kind of have to express them and have them come out." In November 2015, Sony Pictures Animation announced that the third film, under the tentative title of Hotel Transylvania 3, had been set for release on September 21, 2018.

Despite leaving the series, Tartakovsky later announced that he would return as the director for the third installment. Adam Sandler, Selena Gomez, and Andy Samberg also reprised their previous roles, as Dracula, Mavis, and Johnny, respectively, and the film was written by Tartakovsky and Austin Powers writer Michael McCullers. In June 2016, Sony also confirmed Tartakovsky's return, after his taking a leave of absence to work on the final season of his show Samurai Jack. According to Tartakovsky, he returned after he received inspiration from a "miserable" family vacation, and from the Chevy Chase National Lampoon's Vacation movies, as the film takes place aboard a cruise ship. By early November 2017, the film had been entitled Hotel Transylvania 3: Summer Vacation.

One of the biggest challenges for the animation team was creating the massive Kraken character and simulating the water effects and destruction caused by the massive creature.

Music
Mark Mothersbaugh returned to score the third film, having previously scored the first two installments, while Sony Classical Records has released an official soundtrack of the trilogy. Dutch DJ Tiësto also provided music for the film's climax - "Tear It Down" for the disco party, and "Seavolution" and "Wave Rider" for Van Helsing's Kraken brain-washing music; these were all released separately from the soundtrack. DNCE's song "Cake by the Ocean" and Pitbull's song "Shake Senora" were used in promotional material. Eric Nam recorded the song "Float" for the film. "I See Love" performed by Jonas Blue featuring Joe Jonas was featured in the film's end-credits, while Joe Jonas also recorded "It's Party Time" for the film while he was voicing the Kraken. Bruno Mars' song "24K Magic" was also provided for the scene when Dracula dances on the cruise ship as Ericka makes attempts on his life and a fishman (voiced by Chris Parnell) sings a cover version of "Downtown" on stage in another scene. 
During a scene where the characters dance, Gangnam Style plays.

Release

Theatrical

Summer Vacation was originally scheduled for release on September 21, 2018, a date that was later moved up two months earlier to July 13 as Sony rescheduled Goosebumps 2: Haunted Halloween for the original date instead. On June 21, 2018, Amazon announced it was offering its Amazon Prime members an early showing of the film on June 30, at about 1,000 theaters, similar to fellow Sony release Jumanji: Welcome to the Jungle the previous December.

Home media
Summer Vacation was released on DVD, Blu-ray and 4K Ultra HD Blu-ray on October 9, 2018, by Sony Pictures Home Entertainment. 

In April 2021, Sony signed a deal giving Disney access to their legacy content, including past Hotel Transylvania films to stream on Disney+ and Hulu and appear on Disney's linear television networks. Disney's access to Sony's titles would come following their availability on Netflix.

Reception

Box office
Summer Vacation has grossed $167.5 million in the United States and Canada, and $361.1 million in other territories, for a total worldwide gross of $528.6 million against a production budget of $65–80 million. On September 1, 2018, the film surpassed its predecessor, Hotel Transylvania 2, to become Sony Pictures Animation's highest-grossing film worldwide to be completely animated (and second-highest overall behind 2011's The Smurfs); Spider-Man: Into the Spider-Verse would later surpass Hotel Transylvania 2 to become SPA's highest-grossing film domestically in 2019.

In the United States and Canada, Summer Vacation was released alongside the opening of Skyscraper, as well as the wide expansion of Sorry to Bother You, and was projected to gross $38–45 million from 4,267 theaters in its first weekend. The film made $1.3 million from its early 3PM screenings held by Amazon on June 30, and $2.6 million from screenings beginning at 5PM the Thursday before its official release. It went on open to $44.1 million, finishing first at the box office and landing in-between the debuts of the first two Hotel Transylvania films. The film made $23.2 million in its second weekend, finishing second behind newcomers The Equalizer 2 and Mamma Mia! Here We Go Again. It made another $12.3 million in its third weekend, finishing fourth.

Critical response
 The website's critical consensus reads, "Hotel Transylvania 3: Summer Vacation delivers exactly what fans will expect – which means another 97 agreeably lightweight minutes of fast-paced gags and colorful animation." It is the highest rated film of the Hotel Transylvania franchise on Rotten Tomatoes.  Audiences polled by CinemaScore gave the film an average grade of "A−" on an A+ to F scale, the same score earned by both its predecessors.

IGN gave the film score of 7.6 out of 10, saying, "Hotel Transylvania 3: Summer Vacation is mostly funny, BLAH-blah-BLAH!" Conversely, Scott Tobias of Variety gave the film a negative review, stating, "That leaves Hotel Transylvania 3 to look too much like another lackadaisical gathering of Sandler and his frequent on-screen chums, like a PG-rated Grown Ups at sea. They seem like the ones taking the vacation, and it's audiences who are left to pick up the tab." Brian Tallerico of RogerEbert.com wrote, "Trust me, I know that "storytelling" is not the main reason that kids go to third films in a franchise—I have two of my own that love this particular series—but I'm speaking more to the adults who have to pay for the ticket and waste their time here. Kids go for the familiar faces, repeated jokes, and comfortable world they feel they know. Hotel Transylvania 3 gets enough of that right to allow it to stand above the truly abysmal summer animated offerings of recent years (I'm looking at you, The Nut Job 2 and The Emoji Movie). It's not that bad. It's more forgettable than painful. When it was over, I asked my 9-year-old what he would give it. He replied, "I would give it 4 stars but I'm a kid. I'd probably give it 3 if I were an adult." Not quite."

Brian Lowry of CNN wrote, "Creatively, though, unlike the best animated franchises, whatever sense of discovery, surprise or ingenuity that Hotel Transylvania originally offered appears pretty well behind it. That might not mean it's checkout time just yet, but all that seems left is to dig up the pieces, stitch them together, and flip the "on" switch." Scott Mendelson of Forbes gave the film a positive review, saying "Hotel Transylvania 3 feels less like a narrative sequel and more like a casual "episode of the week" animated adventure. When you can watch the TV show at home, the movies must be relative events. This one feels less like an inspired PG-rated, kid-friendly distillation of Sandler's comedy than an animated version of his (comparatively) lazy studio comedies where he and his regular castmates go on a vacation on the studio's dime. The movie looks great, there are a few chuckles, and the kids may enjoy it. But compared to its predecessors, Hotel Transylvania 3 is mostly blah (blah blah)." Jamie Righetti of IndieWire wrote, "With plenty of laughs, truly dazzling animation, and some more of the franchise's signature dance sequences, Hotel Transylvania 3: Summer Vacation is a summer treat worth savoring, and a reminder that if we can see past our differences, we'll find we're not that different after all."

Chris Nashawaty from Entertainment Weekly gave the film a B−, saying "The harmless high jinks all go down easily enough without being particularly memorable or pushing the art form past the expected. Three movies in, the Hotel Transylvania series is undeniably getting a bit long in the fang. It's maybe one more sequel away from having a stake mercifully driven through its heart. Still, it's hard to argue with the sight of an airplane piloted by mischievous gremlins or the film's benign messages of the importance of family and love conquering all. I may have spent large stretches of the film rolling my eyes, but my 5-year-old twins' attention never flagged. Even if, in their eyes, Summer Vacation was no Lego Movie. Then again, for them, nothing could be." Rafer Guzmán of Newsday stated, "In the end, the noisy humor and classic rock songs drown out whatever worthy messages Hotel Transylvania 3 might offer." Geoffrey Macnab of The Independent gave it 2 out of 5 stars, saying "In its scattergun way, parts of the film are funny and very inventive. The hitch is that the storytelling feels so utterly random. All sorts of unrelated ideas are thrown together into the big, sloppy, monster mash of a plot as the cruise continues. The end message, namely that monsters and humans aren't that different and really ought to learn to get along, is sanctimonious in the extreme. Maybe it is time to put a stake through the heart of this particular franchise."

Accolades
The People's Choice Awards nominated the film in the category "Favorite Family Movie". At the 2019 Kids' Choice Awards, Adam Sandler and Selena Gomez won Favorite Male and Female Voice from an Animated Movie, respectively.

Video game 
A video game based on the film, titled Hotel Transylvania 3: Monsters Overboard, was released for Microsoft Windows, Nintendo Switch, PlayStation 4, and Xbox One on July 10, 2018. It was developed by Torus Games and published by Outright Games. While Keegan-Michael Key was the only one to reprise his role from the film, the rest of the cast consists of Brock Powell as Count Dracula, Melissa Sturm as Mavis, Michael Buscemi as Wayne, Julianne Buescher as Ericka, Danny Gendron as Frank, and Brian T. Stevenson as Johnny. Margaret Tang voice directs the video game.

Sequel

In February 2019, Sony Pictures Animation announced that a fourth film was in development and was scheduled to be released on December 22, 2021. In October 2019, Tartakovsky announced he would not direct the film. In April 2020, it was announced that it would be moved up to August 6, 2021. In September 2020, it was announced that Jennifer Kluska and Derek Drymon would replace Tartakovsky as director, although he would still be involved as producer and screenwriter, as well as Selena Gomez reprising her role as Mavis, and serving as executive producer of the film. In April 2021, the film's official title was revealed, Hotel Transylvania: Transformania, and the film's release date was moved up again to July 23, 2021, before moving to October 1, 2021. That same day, Sony confirmed that Adam Sandler would not be returning to voice Dracula in the film and would be replaced by YouTube voice impressionist Brian Hull. It was also announced that Kevin James would not be reprising his role as Frankenstein, and  the role would be given to Brad Abrell. In August 2021, Sony was in discussions to cancel the film's theatrical plans and release it direct-to-streaming, in response to the SARS-CoV-2 Delta variant surges in the United States and the low box office turnouts of Black Widow and The Suicide Squad. On October 6, Amazon Studios acquired the distribution rights to the film for $100 million, and released it exclusively on Prime Video on January 14, 2022, worldwide, excluding China, where Sony would handle a theatrical release.

References

External links 

 
 

2018 3D films
2018 computer-animated films
2010s American animated films
2010s children's comedy films
2010s monster movies
American 3D films
American children's animated comedy films
American comedy horror films
American computer-animated films
American monster movies
American sequel films
Films about father–daughter relationships
Dracula films
Columbia Pictures films
Columbia Pictures animated films
Films scored by Mark Mothersbaugh
Animated films about families
Films about shapeshifting
Films about vacationing
Films directed by Genndy Tartakovsky
Films produced by Michelle Murdocca
Films set in 1897
Films set in 2018
Films set in California
Films set in hotels
Films set in Transylvania
Films set in Romania
Films set in Hungary
Films set in Atlantis
Films set on cruise ships
Films with screenplays by Genndy Tartakovsky
Hotel Transylvania
Kraken in popular culture
Mummy films
Films with screenplays by Michael McCullers
Sony Pictures Animation films
Werewolves in animated film
Crossover films
3D animated films
2018 comedy films
2010s English-language films